Annularodes is a genus of land snails with an operculum, terrestrial gastropod mollusks in the family Pomatiidae.

Species 
Species within the genus Annularodes include:
Annularodes boqueronensis (Torre & Bartsch, 1941)
Annularodes canoaensis (Torre & Bartsch, 1941)
Annularodes cantarillensis (Torre & Bartsch, 1941)
Annularodes indivisa (Welch, 1929)
Annularodes inquisita (Pfeiffer, 1929)
Annularodes morenoi (Torre & Bartsch, 1941)
Annularodes obsoleta (Torre & Bartsch, 1941)
Annularodes perezi (Torre & Bartsch, 1941)
Annularodes pilsbryi (Welch, 1929)
Annularodes terneroensis (Torre & Bartsch, 1941)
Annularodes unicinata (Arango, 1884)

References 

Pomatiidae